Dockside Saloon and Restaurant, or simply Dockside, is a diner in Portland, Oregon.

Description 
Dockside is a diner and dive bar in northwest Portland's Northwest District. The restaurant serves New American cuisine. Portland Monthly says, "With elevated highway lanes as a backdrop and a ramshackle exterior, it might be easy to pass over this diner. But loyal customers fill booths of the cozy interior for classic breakfasts piled high with hash browns and lunches of burgers, sandwiches, and tacos while sports and news play on one of the many screens. Incriminating evidence against Tonya Harding was left in the Dockside Dumpster in the 1990s, but other than that, this friendly joint remains largely drama free."

History 
Chef Terry Peterson and Kathy Peterson are co-owners.

Reception 
In 2017, Suzette Smith of the Portland Mercury wrote:

See also 

 List of diners
 List of dive bars
 List of New American restaurants

References

External links 

 
 Dockside Saloon and Restaurant at Zomato

Diners in Portland, Oregon
Dive bars in Portland, Oregon
New American restaurants in Portland, Oregon
Northwest District, Portland, Oregon